Aman Gal Tappeh (also Romanized as Amān Gal Tappeh; also known as Amān Galū Tappeh) is a village in Aqabad Rural District, in the Central District of Gonbad-e Qabus County, Golestan Province, Iran. At the 2006 census, its population was 550, in 86 families.

References 

Populated places in Gonbad-e Kavus County